Bhargavaea ullalensis  is a Gram-positive, aerobic and non-spore-forming bacterium from the genus of Bhargavaea which has been isolated from coastal sand from the coast of Ullal in India.

References

External links
Type strain of Bhargavaea ullalensis at BacDive -  the Bacterial Diversity Metadatabase	

Bacillales
Bacteria described in 2013